Glaydah Namukasa is a Ugandan writer and midwife. She is the author of two novels, Voice of a Dream and Deadly Ambition. She is a member of FEMRITE, the Ugandan Women Writer's Association, and is currently (2014) its Chairperson. She is one of the 39 African writers announced as part of the Africa39 project unveiled by Rainbow, Hay Festival and Bloomsbury Publishing at the London Book Fair 2014. It is a list of 39 of Sub-Saharan Africa's most promising writers under the age of 40.

Early life and education
Glaydah was born in Entebbe, Uganda. Bereaved of her father as a child, she grew up in Entebbe with her mother, three sisters and two brothers. She studied in Nkumba Primary School, then Entebbe Secondary School. She graduated as a midwife in June 2000 at Kabale Nursing School. Currently, she is working with Wakiso District. She joined the Uganda Female Writers Association, FEMRITE in 2002. Later she joined the British Council Crossing Borders creative writing scheme.

She started her writing career by telling stories to fellow students at Nkumba Primary and Entebbe Secondary School. She used to ask herself why she could not write the stories instead. She would use exercise books to record her stories and later request friends to read through the work. One of her enthusiastic friends, Andrew Byogi, who read them over and over again, recommended her to FEMRITE, where she became an activist and active writer.

Writing

Glaydah's young adult novel, Voice of a Dream, won the 2005/2006 Macmillan Writers Prize for Africa-Senior Prize She was awarded the 2006 Michael and Marylee Fairbanks International Fellowship to attend the Breadloaf Writers' Conference in Ripton, Vermont, USA. 
Her second novel, Deadly Ambition, was published in 2006 as part of the Crossing Borders project. In fall 2008 she was awarded the title of Honorary Fellow by the International Writers Program (IWP), University of Iowa, USA. She has also been a visiting writer in residence at City of Asylum Pittsburgh and Ledig House International writers' residence, Hudson, New York, where she began drafting her second novel. As a participant on Friends of Writing, she is working on her novel Crossing the Bramble Field with mentor Angela Barry. In 2012, her story "My New Home" was part of a project that featured African women on indigenous writing. Her short stories have been published in anthologies in Uganda, South Africa, Sweden and the UK, including in New Daughters of Africa (2019), edited by Margaret Busby. Namukasa has written three books for children, all published under the Pan African, Macmillan imprint.

Published works

Novels

Short stories
 "And Still Hope Survives", in 
 "Then Now and Tomorrow", in 
 "The Naked Bones", in 
 "Ojera's Final Hope", in 
 "The Second Twin", in 
"My New Home", Words Without Borders, 2013
"Dreams dreams and dreams!", authorme.com

Poems

"Yet Hope Survives", Sable Magazine, UK (shortlisted for the Ken Sarowiwa Legacy) 2004
"That Place", FEMRITE Word Write Journal, 2004, republished in Poetry Poster Project, 2008

References

External links
Beatrice Lamwaka, "Ugandans flying Africa’s literary flag", Daily Monitor, 25 April 2014.

Living people
Year of birth missing (living people)
Ugandan women writers
People from Wakiso District
Ugandan novelists
Ugandan women short story writers
Ugandan short story writers
Ugandan women novelists
International Writing Program alumni